George Maurice O'Donoghue (December 8, 1885 – December 5, 1925) was a Canadian ice hockey coach who served as the head coach of the Toronto St. Pats when they won the Stanley Cup championship in 1922.

Coaching record

Awards and achievements
1922  Stanley Cup Championship  (Toronto)

References

1885 births
1925 deaths
Ice hockey people from Ontario
People from Old Toronto
Stanley Cup champions
Toronto Maple Leafs coaches